Yaqoob Ijaz Butt (born 9 September 1988) is a footballer who plays as a defender. Born in Denmark, he represents Pakistan at the international level. His brother, Yousuf Butt, is also a footballer and has played alongside him for Pakistan.

References

External links
 

Living people
1988 births
Danish people of Pakistani descent
Pakistani footballers
People from Herlev Municipality
Association football defenders
Skovshoved IF players
Vanløse IF players
KFUM Roskilde players
Danish 2nd Division players
Pakistan international footballers
Avedøre IF players
Køge Nord FC players
Tårnby FF players
Ballerup-Skovlunde Fodbold players
BK Avarta players
Sportspeople from the Capital Region of Denmark